is a Japanese fiction writer. She has won the Akutagawa Prize, the Bungei Prize, and the Yasunari Kawabata Literary Prize. Her work has been translated into Chinese, Korean, Vietnamese, German, French, and Italian.

Early life and education
Aoyama was born in Saitama Prefecture, Japan. She graduated from the University of Tsukuba, where she studied library science.

Career
After graduating from university, Aoyama moved to Tokyo to take a job at a travel firm. She began writing her first novel, Mado no akari, while working full-time. Mado no akari  was published in 2005, and won the 42nd Bungei Prize. In 2007 Hitori biyori, Aoyama's story about freeters working part-time jobs, won the 136th Akutagawa Prize. After winning the Akutagawa Prize, Aoyama quit her office job to pursue writing full-time. In 2009 she won the Yasunari Kawabata Literary Prize for her short story Kakera, which was published in a collection of the same name. She was the youngest author ever to win the prize. Watashi no kareshi, Aoyama's first full-length novel, was published in 2011. In 2016 she collaborated with illustrator Satoe Tone on the children's book Watashi Otsuki-sama.

Writing style
Aoyama has cited Françoise Sagan and Kazuo Ishiguro as literary influences. Literary scholar Judith Pascoe proposed that Wuthering Heights was a literary influence on Aoyama's work, particularly Meguri ito, and later confirmed this influence with Aoyama herself.

Recognition
 2005 42nd Bungei Prize
 2007 136th Akutagawa Prize (2006下)
 2009 Yasunari Kawabata Literary Prize

Bibliography
 Mado no akari (窓の灯, "The Light of Windows"), Kawade Shobō Shinsha, 2005, 
 Hitori biyori (ひとり日和, "A Perfect Day to Be Alone"), Kawade Shobō Shinsha, 2007, 
 Yasashii tameiki (やさしいため息, "A Gentle Sigh"), Kawade Shobō Shinsha, 2008, 
 Kakera (かけら, "Fragments"), Shinchosha, 2009, 
 Mahou tsukai kurabu (魔法使いクラブ, "Magic Users Club"), Gentosha, 2009, 
 Owakare no oto (お別れの音, "The Sound of Separation"), Bungeishunjū, 2010 
 Watashi no kareshi (わたしの彼氏, "My Boyfriend"), Kodansha, 2011, 
 Akari no kohan (あかりの湖畔, "The Lakeshore in the Light"), 2011, Chuokoron-Shinsha, 2011, 
 Hanayome (花嫁, "The Bride"), Gentosha, 2012, 
 Sumire (Sumire), Bungeishunjū, 2012, 
 Meguri ito (めぐり糸), Shueisha, 2013, 
 Kairaku (快楽, Pleasure), Kodansha, 2013, 
 Kaze, Kawade Shobō Shinsha, 2014, 
 Mayu, Shinchōsha, 2015, 
 Watashi otsukisama, NHK, 2016 
 Hatchi to mārō, Shōgakukan, 2017,

References

External links
 J'Lit | Authors : Nanae Aoyama | Books from Japan 

1983 births
Living people
20th-century Japanese novelists
21st-century Japanese novelists
Akutagawa Prize winners
University of Tsukuba alumni